Amazing-Man is the name used by four fictional characters published by DC Comics. The first three are African-American superheroes and are members of the same family. The first Amazing-Man debuted in All-Star Squadron #23 (July 1983), and was created by Roy Thomas and Jerry Ordway. The second Amazing-Man debuted in Justice League America #86 (March 1994), and was created by Dan Vado and Marc Campos. The third Amazing-Man debuted in Justice Society of America vol. 3 #12 (March 2008), and was created by Geoff Johns and Dale Eaglesham. The fourth Amazing Man debuted in OMAC vol. 3 #2 (December 2011), and was created by Dan DiDio and Keith Giffen.

Publication history
Although a 1980s creation of writer Roy Thomas, the Amazing-Man published by DC Comics was placed in the 1940s and made a contemporary of various Golden Age superheroes. The character was created by Roy Thomas as a tribute to Bill Everett's Amazing-Man, a character he created for Centaur Publications during the so-called Golden Age of Comic Books.

Fictional character biography

Will Everett
Will Everett was a promising young African-American Olympian who had competed in the 1936 Summer Olympics in Berlin, but his post-Olympic career devolved into a janitorial profession at a laboratory owned by Dr. Terry Curtis. During an accident involving the explosion of some equipment to which he was exposed (developed by the criminal mastermind the Ultra-Humanite), Everett quickly developed the ability to mimic whatever properties he touched (similar to Marvel Comics' Absorbing Man). For example, if he touched steel, then his body became composed of steel.

All-Star Squadron

At first, he was employed by the Ultra-Humanite as a henchman along with Curtis (as Cyclotron) and Deathbolt. However, his sympathies soon swayed towards the side of good after repeated exposure to the All-Star Squadron, a team of both Golden Age characters and retroactive characters like himself, with whom he joined to defeat his former employer's machinations. He then served a lengthy stint as a member of this voluminous mystery man organization.

In February 1942, the Squadron helped Everett defeat the bigoted villain in his home town of Detroit, the Real American. During the first Crisis, Amazing-Man was one of a group of heroes chosen by the Monitor to stop the Anti-Monitor's quest for destruction. On a future case, Amazing-Man's powers changed so that now he had mastery of magnetism while losing his ability to mimic matter.

Civil Rights Activist
In the 1950s, his secret identity was revealed to the general public by J. Edgar Hoover. This act endangered the lives of Everett's wife and family. During the Civil Rights Movement of the 1960s, the murder of his nephew alongside two other civil rights activists spurred his involvement in the Civil Rights Movement of the time. He led marches against segregation across the United States, and also helped to quell riots in Detroit. Everett was also responsible for the capture of Martin Luther King Jr.'s murderer, James Earl Ray. In the DC Comics Universe, he is considered the third most important advocate for African American civil rights, behind only King and Malcolm X.

Heirs
It was later revealed that his grandson, Will Everett III (a.k.a. "Junior") also developed mimicry abilities. Will Everett Senior was last seen in the hospital, visited by his grandson Will Everett III. The senior Everett was dying of cancer. The status of his son, the father of Amazing-Man III, is currently unknown. For a brief time, his grandson carried on the legacy of Amazing-Man before dying tragically. Later, another grandson named Markus Clay would take up the mantle of Amazing-Man.

Will Everett III

Will Everett III carried on his grandfather's heroic tradition, joining the Justice League at Wonder Woman's request. As a member, he was instrumental in defeating the Overmaster alongside the other members of the League and reformed members of the Cadre of the Immortal. Soon after this, Captain Atom formed a splinter group of the JLA nicknamed Extreme Justice. He remained with this team until its end.

Later, Will joined the Crimson Fox's unofficial re-grouping of Justice League Europe. In their single ill-fated adventure, Will was apparently killed by a supervillainess named the Mist, along with the Crimson Fox and Blue Devil. In Amazing-Man's case, Mist tricked him into mimicking glass and then shattered him. The status of his father Will Everett II is unknown, but his cousin Markus Clay is the new Amazing-Man.

During the events of JLA/Avengers, Will was briefly resurrected by the effects of Krona's tampering with reality. He was shown fighting the Absorbing Man, an enemy of Thor.

Years later during 52, Will is memorialized by Martian Manhunter with a statue in Happy Harbor alongside other fallen Justice League members.

Markus Clay
The third Amazing-Man is a man named Markus Clay, who operates out of New Orleans, Louisiana. He is Will Everett's other grandson, and the cousin of Will Everett III. Markus is currently helping survivors of Hurricane Katrina. A recent recruit of the Justice Society of America, he has helped the team communicate with Gog. After Gog's defeat, Markus returns to New Orleans, considering forming a team of his own.

Despite having resigned from the JSA, Markus is seen attending Damage's funeral following his death during Blackest Night.

The New 52
A new Amazing-Man appears following the events of Flashpoint in The New 52, where among other changes, the JSA has been removed from the history of Prime Earth. The new Amazing-Man is revealed to be Rocker Bonn, a former Checkmate agent who was given metahuman abilities by Project Cadmus. After going into hiding in Texas, Bonn is attacked by Kevin Kho, the new OMAC. Bonn is defeated by Kho and subsequently absorbed by Brother Eye, who states that he may prove useful at a later date.

Powers and abilities
 Will Everett was originally capable of transforming himself into a living, breathing facsimile of any material that he touched. Later Will Everett's powers were altered, and he was instead able to magnetically attract or repel objects with his hands.
 Will Everett III could cause his body to duplicate the properties of any inorganic material he touched from stone to glass. If he touched the pavement, for example, he became a sentient being made of living stone, with all its commensurate strengths and weaknesses. Will Everett III could also absorb and duplicate vast amounts of energy, as when he defeated the Overmaster by draining and duplicating its powers.
 Markus Clay appears to possess the same abilities as the first two Amazing-Men.

References

External links
 World of Black Heroes: Amazing man 1 Biography
 World of Black Heroes: Amazing Man 2 Biography
 World of Black Heroes: Amazing Man 3 Biography
DCU Guide: Amazing-Man
DCU Guide: Amazing-Man
Who's Who in the DC Universe: Amazing-Man (Archived 2009-10-25)

Articles about multiple fictional characters
African-American superheroes
Characters created by Geoff Johns
Characters created by Jerry Ordway
Characters created by Keith Giffen
Characters created by Roy Thomas
Comics characters introduced in 1983
Comics characters introduced in 1994
Comics characters introduced in 2008
Comics characters introduced in 2011
DC Comics characters who are shapeshifters
DC Comics male superheroes
DC Comics metahumans
Earth-Two
Fictional characters with absorption or parasitic abilities
Fictional characters with electric or magnetic abilities
Fictional characters with energy-manipulation abilities
Fictional Olympic competitors